The 2020 Sparkassen ATP Challenger was a professional tennis tournament played on indoor hard courts in Ortisei, Italy between 16 and 22 November 2020. It was the eleventh edition of the tournament and was part of the 2020 ATP Challenger Tour.

Singles main-draw entrants

Seeds

 1 Rankings are as of 9 November 2020.

Other entrants
The following players received wildcards into the singles main draw:
  Luca Nardi
  Patric Prinoth
  Giulio Zeppieri

The following player received entry into the singles main draw as a special exempt:
  Lukáš Klein

The following players received entry from the qualifying draw:
  Altuğ Çelikbilek
  Johannes Härteis
  Pavel Kotov
  Andrea Pellegrino

The following players received entry as lucky losers:
  Evgeny Karlovskiy
  Alexey Vatutin

Champions

Singles

 Ilya Ivashka def.  Antoine Hoang 6–4, 3–6, 7–6(7–3).

Doubles

 Andre Begemann /  Albano Olivetti def.  Ivan Sabanov /  Matej Sabanov 6–3, 6–2.

References

2020 ATP Challenger Tour
2020
2020 in Italian tennis
November 2020 sports events in Italy